Marco Giovanni Reguzzoni  (born 30 May 1971 in Busto Arsizio) is an Italian politician and entrepreneur.

He was President of Varese Province from 2002 to 2008. He was a member of the Italian Parliament as congressman and president of the Northern League group since 2013 and now he is the President of Volandia, the largest museum of flight in Europe.

Biography 
Bachelor in economical science and engineering, he was councilman in Busto Arsizio (from 1993 to 1997) and province councilman from 1993. He was a member of Lombard League since 1986, he was province chairman and federal CEO since he was very young.

In 2002 he was elected President of the Province of Varese, becoming the youngest president ever elected in a province in Italy. In 2007 he was re-elected President with about 70% of preferences, and was appointed National Vice-secretary of the Lombard League.

Manager of a company as Fiera Milano, he founded a science oriented company, Biocell Center  leader in amniotic stem cells studies, with subsidiaries in Lugano (CH), London and Boston, MA.
 
Known as a moderate young emerging leader, he is a vice chairman of north league group and he is a member of Industry and Commerce Committee in the Italian Parliament, and he signed with Santo Versace an important law concerned textile products called "Reguzzoni-Versace Law".

In 2005 he participated at International Leadership Program, a US government sponsored program reserved to emerging leaders, and he became a member of state alumni association. He is honorary citizen of Louisville, Kentucky and a member of Amerigo Italian Chapter.

In 2008 he was elected to the Chamber of Deputies and became the parliamentary chairman of the Northern League. He resigned as chairman in 2012, succeeded by Gianpaolo Dozzo.

In 2017 Reguzzoni joined the Great North party.

Books 

 De Agostini "Varese Provincia d'Autore", photograph book with imagines of Varese province, written in collaboration with important leader. Translated in eight languages.
 Mondadori printing - Il Giornale "Expo 2015, un'opportunità per tutti". More than 10.000 copies sold. 
 Macchione Editore "Marketing of Landing". University of Varese courses .
 Rizzoli "Vento del Nord", 2011.

Papers review 

 School of federalism
 Road cycling championship
 Reguzzoni asked to reduce the ban of Ivan Basso
 BBC news msnbc news
 Other articles en English 
wikioScheda personale - Camera dei Deputati
 Biocell Center
 Biocell Center

References

1971 births
Living people
People from Busto Arsizio
Lega Nord politicians
Members of the Chamber of Deputies (Italy)
Polytechnic University of Milan alumni
Presidents of the Province of Varese